The Texas City Prairie Preserve is a  nature preserve located on the shores of Moses Lake and Galveston Bay in Texas City, Texas in the United States, near Houston. The preserve was created in 1995 by the Nature Conservancy thanks to a $2.2 million donation of land by ExxonMobil. The primary goal in creating the preserve was to save the endangered Attwater's prairie chicken, though the preserve protects coastal prairie and supports a wide variety of wildlife.

The terrain of the preserve includes prairie and wetland habitats, enabled in large part by restoration efforts in recent decades. The preserve includes  of limited public access areas including a small hiking trail. The remainder of the preserve is closed but available for tours and access at the discretion of preserve staff, including birding events and volunteer events.

The preserve is part of the Great Texas Coastal Birding Trail, a network of preserves and trails along the Texas coast featuring habitats for birds and other wildlife.

Controversy
1999 the Nature Conservancy commissioned an oil and gas operator to set up a new gas well inside the preserve. The location was "the closest to where the prairie chickens normally hung out, or normally boomed."

In 2010 a paper was presented at a Society of Petroleum Engineers conference stating that the original well "died in March 2003, and was unable to flow due to excessive water production." A new well was drilled in the same area in late 2007, the new well was for oil while the original was for natural gas.

Due to a change in release strategy by the Attwater's Prairie Chicken Recovery Team, captive-bred bird releases were stopped in 2011. There are no more Attwater's prairie chickens on the land as of 2012.

References

Further reading
 Klein, Naomi (2014). This Changes Everything. New York, NY: Simon & Schuster

External links

 Gulf Coast Bird Observatory: Texas City Prairie Preserve
 Nature Conservancy: Texas City Prairie Preserve

Nature reserves in Texas
Protected areas of Galveston County, Texas
Galveston Bay Area
Nature Conservancy preserves
Texas City, Texas
1995 establishments in Texas
Protected areas established in 1995